

First round selections

The following are the first round picks in the 1995 Major League Baseball draft.

* Did not sign

Background
Outfielder Darin Erstad of the University of Nebraska was the first pick in the 1995 Rule 4 Draft. Erstad compiled a career .356 average in three seasons with the Cornhuskers, including 41 runs and 182 RBI in 176 games. He was the first Big Eight player to be selected as the number one pick in a Major League Baseball Rule 4 Draft.

Among the first round selections was Kerry Wood, fourth overall by the Cubs. Wood made it to the majors in 1998 and won Rookie of the Year honors later that season. In just his fifth major league start, he tied the major league record of 20 strikeouts in a single game.

NFL great Tom Brady was drafted in the 18th round by the Montreal Expos, though he never signed with the team.

Other notable players
Jarrod Washburn, 2nd round, 31st overall by the California Angels
Mark Bellhorn, 2nd round, 35th overall by the Oakland Athletics
Marlon Anderson, 2nd round, 42nd overall by the Philadelphia Phillies
Craig Wilson, 2nd round, 47th overall by the Toronto Blue Jays
Carlos Beltrán, 2nd round, 49th overall by the Kansas City Royals
Sean Casey, 2nd round, 53rd overall by the Cleveland Indians
Brett Tomko, 2nd round, 54th overall by the Cincinnati Reds
Randy Winn, 3rd round, 65th overall by the Florida Marlins
Ryan Dempster, 3rd round, 66th overall by the Texas Rangers
Bronson Arroyo, 3rd round, 69th overall by the Pittsburgh Pirates
J.J. Putz, 3rd round, 84th overall by the Chicago White Sox, but did not sign
Adam Everett, 4th round, 91st overall by the Chicago Cubs, but did not sign
Russ Ortiz, 4th round, 103rd overall by the San Francisco Giants
Doug Mientkiewicz, 5th round, 128th overall by the Minnesota Twins
Jason LaRue, 5th round, 139th overall by the Cincinnati Reds
Brian Schneider, 5th round, 143rd overall by the Montreal Expos
Danny Kolb, 6th round, 150th overall by the Texas Rangers
Joe Nathan, 6th round, 159th overall by the San Francisco Giants
Brian Miller, 7th round, 174th overall by the Kansas City Royals, but did not sign
Craig Monroe, 8th round, 206th overall by the Texas Rangers
A. J. Burnett, 8th round, 217th overall by the New York Mets
Ray King, 8th round, 223rd overall by the Cincinnati Reds
Ryan Freel, 10th round, 272nd overall by the Toronto Blue Jays
David Dellucci, 10th round, 276th overall by the Baltimore Orioles
Ted Lilly, 13th round, 356th overall by the Toronto Blue Jays, but did not sign
Brad Wilkerson, 13th round, 359th overall by the Los Angeles Dodgers, but did not sign
Mark Hendrickson, 16th round, 434th overall by the Detroit Tigers, but did not sign
Scott Proctor, 17th round, 469th overall by the New York Mets, but did not sign
David Ross, 19th round, 527th overall by the Los Angeles Dodgers, but did not sign
Aaron Miles, 19th round, 529th overall by the Houston Astros
Mike Lowell, 20th round, 562nd overall by the New York Yankees
Brian Fuentes, 25th round, 678th overall by the Seattle Mariners
Matt Thornton, 27th round, 742nd overall by the Detroit Tigers, but did not sign
Juan Pierre, 30th round, 818th overall by the Seattle Mariners, but did not sign
Rob Mackowiak, 30th round, 839th overall by the Cincinnati Reds, but did not sign
Pedro Feliciano, 31st round, 863rd overall by the Los Angeles Dodgers
Nate Robertson, 35th round, 980th overall by the Chicago White Sox, but did not sign
D. J. Carrasco, 39th round, 1074th overall by the Texas Rangers, but did not sign
Aaron Rowand, 40th round, 1113th overall by the New York Mets, but did not sign
Brad Lidge, 42nd round, 1167th overall by the San Francisco Giants, but did not sign
Jerry Hairston Jr., 42nd round, 1172nd overall by the Baltimore Orioles, but did not sign
Pat Burrell, 43rd round, 1194th overall by the Boston Red Sox, but did not sign
Casey Blake, 45th round, 1259th overall by the New York Yankees, but did not sign
Cliff Politte, 54th round, 1438th overall by the St. Louis Cardinals
Justin Speier, 55th round, 1452nd overall by the Chicago Cubs
Mark Mulder, 55th round, 1455th overall by the Detroit Tigers, but did not sign
Gabe Kapler, 57th round, 1487th overall by the Detroit Tigers
Kip Wells, 58th round, 1501st overall by the Milwaukee Brewers, but did not sign

NFL players drafted 
Chad Hutchinson, 1st round, 26th overall by the Atlanta Braves, but did not sign
Ricky Williams, 8th round, 213th overall by the Philadelphia Phillies
Tom Brady, 18th round, 507th overall by the Montreal Expos, but did not sign
Lawyer Milloy, 19th round, 518th overall by the Detroit Tigers, but did not sign
Danny Kanell, 25th round, 702nd overall by the New York Yankees, but did not sign
Daunte Culpepper, 26th round, 730th overall by the New York Yankees, but did not sign
Michael Bishop, 28th round, 782nd overall by the Cleveland Indians, but did not sign

External links
Complete draft list from The Baseball Cube database

References

Major League Baseball draft
Draft
Major League Baseball draft